The 2020–21 season was ŠK Slovan Bratislava's 15th consecutive in the top flight of Slovak football.

Slovan were successful in their defence of the domestic double, after winning their third Slovak Super Liga title in a row and a second consecutive Slovak Cup title.

Having won the 2019–20 Slovak First Football League, Slovan contested in the UEFA Champions League, but were eliminated in the first qualifying round after a technical victory was awarded to the opponent according to the regulations related to COVID-19. Subsequently, Slovan competed in the UEFA Europa League, but were eliminated in the second qualifying round.

The season covers the period from July 2020 to 31 May 2021.

Players

As of 22 May 2021

Transfers and loans

Transfers in

Transfers out

Loans out

Friendlies

Pre-season

Mid-season

Competition overview

Fortuna liga

League table

Regular stage

Championship group

Results summary

Results by matchday

Matches

Slovak Cup

UEFA Champions League

First qualifying round

UEFA Europa League

Second qualifying round

Statistics

Goalscorers

Clean sheets

Disciplinary record

Awards

Fortuna liga Goal of the Month

Fortuna liga Team of the Season

Fortuna liga Under-21 Team of the Season

Notes

References

ŠK Slovan Bratislava seasons
ŠK Slovan Bratislava season
Slovan Bratislava
Slovan Bratislava